The Church of St Francis Xavier is a Roman Catholic parish of the Archdiocese of Singapore, established in 1959 to cater to the needs of the residents of Serangoon Gardens as well as the neighbourhoods of Braddell Heights and Serangoon.

Following Major renovations in the year 2000, the church now serves about 5,000 parishioners and is one of the larger Catholic churches in the Serangoon district.

History
In early 1957, Archbishop Olçomendy purchased a 5-acre plot of land in the Serangoon Garden Estate.

Originally planned to house British military forced based in Singapore, the area housed around 15,000 people back in the 1950s. This land would have the Church as well as a primary school managed by the Infant Jesus Sisters.

After the land in Serangoon Garden was purchased, Father Philippe Meisonnier was appointed to take charge of the church building efforts. Together with members of the Church building committee, Father Meisonnier wasted no time, visiting the people every evening with his trademark fabric bag slung on his shoulders, to make personal appeals for funds to build the church.

Finally on 11 January 1959, Archbishop Olçomendy officially blessed the new Church with Father Rene Challet appointed to be its first parish priest. By 1964, the first Parish Council was set up to act as an advisory body to the parish priest. The original parish boundary was centred around the Serangoon Garden Estate, and extended outwards to include Braddell Heights, St Helier's Avenue, Brighton Crescent and Plantation Avenue.

Subsequently, in the 1970s, the area bounded by the Johor Straits, the Ponggol River, the Seletar River and Yio Chu Kang Road was carved out to be under the Church of St Vincent de Paul in 1970. The areas under Ang Mo Kio New Town were also divided between the Church of the Holy Spirit and St Francis Xavier Church to manage.

With a growing Catholic community in the parish, a Parish Social Centre was built in 1977 to be a place where the youth of the parish could receive religious education, and adults could use to meet, bond and help each other. A Play School was added on within the Parish Social Centre and kindergarten classes began to run in 1978.

Extending its reach to the community within the area, Church members began making regular visits to the Cheshire Home in 1979, and bringing members of the Cheshire Home for mass on Sundays. Under Father John Sim's leadership, several renovation projects were undertaken from 1993 to 2004 to provide for a new canteen, a parsonage, an expanded Church and a new parish centre.

As part of the Great Jubilee year of celebrations in 1999 to 2000, St Francis Xavier Church was one of the five churches designated to be pilgrimage Churches.

Today, the Church of St Francis Xavier proudly serves a population of 5,000 Catholics living in the Serangoon area.

References

External links
Church of Saint Francis Xavier 

Roman Catholic churches completed in 1958
1958 establishments in Singapore
20th-century Roman Catholic church buildings in Singapore